Isa Bulku is an Albanian former footballer who played in the USL A- League, and the Canadian Professional Soccer League.

Playing career 
Bulku played with London Croatia in 1997. In 1999, he played with the Toronto Lynx of the USL A-League. He made his debut on July 8, 1999, against Connecticut Wolves. In total he played in 3 matches for the club. In 2003, he signed with London City of the Canadian Professional Soccer League. In 2011, he served as an assistant coach for London City under Luka Shaqiri.

References  

Living people
Association football forwards
Albanian footballers
Toronto Lynx players
London City players
A-League (1995–2004) players
Canadian Soccer League (1998–present) players
Albanian expatriate footballers
Expatriate soccer players in Canada
Albanian expatriates in Canada
Year of birth missing (living people)